Mike McLellan (born September 4, 1981) is an indoor lacrosse player for the Philadelphia Wings in the National Lacrosse League and an outdoor lacrosse player formerly of the Hamilton Nationals of Major League Lacrosse. Nicknamed "The Maestro", he played college lacrosse at Mercyhurst University and was named a two-time NCAA Division II All-American.

McLellan was drafted 14th overall by the Edmonton Rush in the 2005 NLL Entry Draft, and was immediately traded to the Arizona Sting. The following year McLellan was acquired by the New York Titans in the 2006 NLL Expansion Draft.

In week 14 of the 2007 NLL season, McLellan was awarded Rookie of the Week honors. Was named to the NLL ALL Rookie Team.

On August 6, 2010, McLellan was selected by the Toronto Rock in the NLL Dispersal Draft of Orlando Titans players. He was then traded by the Rock and to the Colorado Mammoth for a second round pick in the 2011 draft.  Signed as a free agent with the Philadelphia Wings in 2011. Retired from pro lacrosse before the start of the 2014 season ending a 9-year pro career.

Statistics

NLL

References

External links
NLL stats page
Toronto Nationals stats page

1981 births
Living people
Arizona Sting players
Canadian lacrosse players
Edmonton Rush players
Lacrosse people from Ontario
Mercyhurst Lakers men's lacrosse players
New York Titans (lacrosse) players
Orlando Titans players
Sportspeople from Toronto
Hamilton Nationals players
Colorado Mammoth players